Gerrit Yates Lansing (August 4, 1783 – January 3, 1862) was a U.S. Representative from New York.

Early life
Lansing was born in Albany, New York on August 4, 1783.  He was third of sixteen children born to Susanna Yates (1762–1840) and Abraham Gerrit Lansing (1756–1844), the New York State Treasurer.  His younger sister, Susan Yates Lansing (1804–1874), became the second wife of Peter Gansevoort (1788–1876), son of Gen. Peter Gansevoort, in 1843.

He was the nephew of John Lansing Jr.  His maternal grandfather was Abraham Yates (1724–1796).

Lansing pursued classical studies and was graduated from Union College in 1800.  He studied law, was admitted to the bar in 1804 and commenced practice in Albany.

Career
Lansing worked as the private secretary to Governor Morgan Lewis, the third Governor of New York.

He served as Clerk of the New York State Assembly in 1807.  He served as judge of the Albany County probate court from 1816 to 1823.

Lansing was elected a regent of the University of the State of New York in 1829 and served until his death.  He was appointed chancellor of the board on October 31, 1842 and served until his death.

He was elected as a Jacksonian to the Twenty-second, Twenty-third, and Twenty-fourth Congresses (March 4, 1831 – March 3, 1837).  He was not a candidate for reelection in 1836, and returned to practicing law.

Lansing served as president of the Albany Savings Bank from 1854 until his death, and president of the Albany Insurance Company from 1859 until his death.

Personal life
In March 1808, Lansing married Helen Ten Eyck (1787–1838), the daughter of Abraham Ten Eyck (1744–1824) and Annatje (née Lansing) Ten Eyck (1746–1823).  Their children included:

 Charles Bridgen Lansing (1809–1890), who married Catherine Clinton Townsend, daughter of Albany Mayor John Townsend and Abby (née Spencer) Townsend (daughter of Ambrose Spencer). After her death, he married her sister, Abby Townsend.
 Jane Ann Lansing (1811–1886), who married Robert Hewson Pruyn (1815–1882), the U.S. Minister to Japan, in 1841.
 Susan Yates Lansing (1816–1911), who died unmarried.
 Abraham Gerrit Lansing (d. 1824), who died unmarried.

Lansing died in Albany on January 3, 1862.  He was interred at Albany Rural Cemetery.

References

Sources

External links

1783 births
1862 deaths
New York (state) lawyers
New York (state) state court judges
Union College (New York) alumni
Politicians from Albany, New York
Burials at Albany Rural Cemetery
Regents of the University of the State of New York
Jacksonian members of the United States House of Representatives from New York (state)
Clerks of the New York State Assembly
19th-century American politicians
Lansing family
Ten Eyck family
Members of the United States House of Representatives from New York (state)